John Lyons (c.1667 – 1726 or 1732) was an Irish politician. 

Lyons sat in the Irish House of Commons as the Member of Parliament for Athy from 1713 to 1714.

References

Year of birth uncertain
Year of death unknown
17th-century Anglo-Irish people
18th-century Anglo-Irish people
Irish MPs 1713–1714
Members of the Parliament of Ireland (pre-1801) for County Kildare constituencies